Tan-y-Bwlch means under the pass in Welsh and may refer to the following places in Wales:
Tan-y-Bwlch, Aberystwyth, a nature reserve
Tan-y-Bwlch, Maentwrog, a village
Tan-y-Bwlch railway station
Plas Tan y Bwlch, the Snowdonia National Park environmental studies centre